The 1892 Boston Beaneaters season was the 22nd season of the franchise. The Beaneaters won their second straight and fifth overall National League pennant. In the league's first split season, the Beaneaters finished first in the first half, and three games behind the Cleveland Spiders in the second half. After the season, the two teams played a "World's Championship Series", which the Beaneaters won, five games to none (with one tie). The National League did not play another split season until .

Regular season

Season standings

Record vs. opponents

Roster

Player stats

Batting

Starters by position 
Note: Pos = Position; G = Games played; AB = At bats; H = Hits; Avg. = Batting average; HR = Home runs; RBI = Runs batted in

Other batters 
Note: G = Games played; AB = At bats; H = Hits; Avg. = Batting average; HR = Home runs; RBI = Runs batted in

Pitching

Starting pitchers 
Note: G = Games pitched; IP = Innings pitched; W = Wins; L = Losses; ERA = Earned run average; SO = Strikeouts

Relief pitchers 
Note: G = Games pitched; W = Wins; L = Losses; SV = Saves; ERA = Earned run average; SO = Strikeouts

World's Championship Series

The Boston Beaneaters, first-half champions, played the second-half champion Cleveland Spiders in a best-of-nine postseason series. After a 0–0 tie in the opener, called on account of darkness after 11 innings, Boston defeated Cleveland five games in a row for a sweep. Hall of Famer Hugh Duffy batted .462 with nine runs batted in and six extra-base hits including a home run.

References

External links 
1892 Boston Beaneaters season at Baseball Reference

Boston Beaneaters seasons
Boston Beaneaters
Boston Beaneaters
19th century in Boston
National League champion seasons